Andreas Creusen (1591–1666) was a Dutch Catholic clergyman who became bishop of Roermond (1651–1657) and Archbishop of Mechelen (1657–1666).

Biography
Creusen was born in Maastricht and studied at the Latin school and the Jesuit college of his native town, before further studies in Rome. He obtained his doctoral degree in theology at the University of Vienna. He was appointed a councillor to the Holy Roman Emperor and great-chaplain to the imperial armies in Germany and Hungary. After he returned to the Low Countries he was made a canon of the cathedral of Cambrai in 1630. In 1640 he was appointed archdeacon of Brabant and in 1651 bishop of Roermond. In 1657 he was appointed to the see of Mechelen.

After his death in Brussels in November 1666 he was buried in the choir of St. Rumbold's Cathedral in Mechelen. His funeral monument was designed and executed by the famous sculptor Lucas Faydherbe.

1591 births
1666 deaths
17th-century Roman Catholic archbishops in the Holy Roman Empire
17th-century Roman Catholic bishops in the Holy Roman Empire
People from Maastricht
Roman Catholic archbishops of Mechelen-Brussels
Bishops of Roermond